An -net or epsilon net in mathematics may refer to:

 E-net (probability theory) for uses in probability theory
 ε-net (computational geometry) for uses in computational geometry
 ε-net (metric spaces) for uses in metric spaces